Spelaeorchestia koloana, the Kauai cave amphipod or  in Hawaiian, is a cave-dwelling crustacean only found on the Hawaiian island of Kauai. It is only known from 10 populations, and eats decaying plant matter and other decomposing material.

The Kauai cave amphipod is endemic to the caves on Kauai, Hawaii. Its main predator is the Kauai cave wolf spider Adelocosa anops, another endemic of the Kauai cave. It is listed as an endangered species under the Endangered Species Act, and on the IUCN Red List.

References

Gammaridea
Cave crustaceans
Crustaceans of Hawaii
Freshwater crustaceans of North America
Biota of Kauai
Monotypic arthropod genera
Endemic fauna of Hawaii
Taxobox binomials not recognized by IUCN